Admirers of the Spartans typically praise their valor and success in war. The Battle of Thermopylae, mythologized as 300 Spartans blocking the pass of Thermopylae for three days against a force of 1 Million Persians, represents bravery against all odds. Laconophilia is love or admiration of Sparta and of the Spartan culture or constitution. The selection of Spartans as the name of a sports team is an example of this continued admiration in popular culture.

Non-scholastic teams 
Blyth Spartans A.F.C. (Northern Premier League), Blyth, Northumberland, England
Hamrun Spartans F.C. (Maltese Premier League), Ħamrun, Malta
La Crosse Spartans (Indoor Football League), La Crosse, Wisconsin
Manchester Village Spartans RUFC (North West Intermediate Rugby Union League), Manchester, England
Salem Spartans – ( One of  the eight franchise based on Salem city in Tamil Nadu Premier League, India)
Southern Oregon Spartans (Western States Hockey League), Medford, Oregon
Spartan Cricket Club, Barbados
Leeming Spartan Cricket Club, Leeming, Western Australia
Spartans F.C. (Lowland Football League), Edinburgh, Scotland
AC Sparta Prague (Czech First League), Prague, Czechia
Sparta Rotterdam (Eredivisie), Rotterdam, the Netherlands

University teams 

 NCAA Division I FBS

Michigan State University, East Lansing, Michigan 
San Jose State University, San Jose, California 

 NCAA Division I FCS

Norfolk State University, Norfolk, Virginia 

 NCAA Division I non-football

University of North Carolina, Greensboro, North Carolina 
University of South Carolina Upstate, Spartanburg, South Carolina 

 NCAA Division II

St. Thomas Aquinas College, Rockland County, New York
University of Tampa, Tampa, Florida 

 NCAA Division III

University of Dubuque, Dubuque, Iowa
Case Western Reserve University, Cleveland, Ohio 
Manchester University, North Manchester, Indiana
York College of Pennsylvania, York, Pennsylvania
 Other

Trinity Western University, Langley, British Columbia
University of the Sunshine Coast, Sippy Downs, Queensland, Australia

Secondary school teams
Adlai E. Stevenson High School, Livonia, Michigan
Amity Regional High School, Woodbridge, Connecticut
Athens Academy, Athens, Georgia
Bernalillo High School, Bernalillo, New Mexico
Bishop Stang High School, North Dartmouth, Massachusetts
Bishop Walsh School, Cumberland, Maryland
Bixby High School, Bixby, Oklahoma
Boardman High School, Mahoning County, Ohio
Brentwood High School, Brentwood, Pennsylvania
Broad Run High School, Loudoun County, Virginia
Brookfield East High School, Brookfield, Wisconsin
Camelback High School, Phoenix, Arizona
Campbell High School, Smyrna, Georgia
Centennial Collegiate Vocational Institute, Guelph, Ontario
Central Davidson High School, Lexington, North Carolina
Central Union High School, El Centro, California
Christ Covenant School, Winterville, North Carolina
Missouri Baptist University, Saint Louis, Missouri
Claremont Secondary School, Saanich, British Columbia
Collins-Maxwell School, Maxwell, Iowa
Connersville High School, Connersville, Indiana
Conneaut High School, Conneaut, Ohio
Corvallis High School, Corvallis, Oregon
Damien High School, La Verne, California
De La Salle High School, Concord, California
De Smet Jesuit High School, Creve Coeur, Missouri
DePaul Catholic High School, Wayne, New Jersey
Deptford High School, Deptford Township, New Jersey
Dunbarton High School, Pickering, Ontario
East Longmeadow High School, East Longmeadow, Massachusetts
East Syracuse-Minoa High School, East Syracuse, New York
Emporia High School, Emporia, Kansas
Fargo North High School, Fargo, North Dakota
Framingham North High School, Framingham, Massachusetts
Garden Spot High School, New Holland, Pennsylvania
Glenbrook North High School, Northbrook, Illinois
Greenbrier East High School, Fairlea, West Virginia
Greater Atlanta Christian School, Norcross, Georgia
Hillsboro High School, Hillsboro, Oregon
Holy Spirit High School, Absecon, New Jersey
Homestead High School, Fort Wayne, Indiana
Laurel High School, Laurel, Maryland
Lewis S. Mills High School, Burlington, Connecticut
Lincoln East High School, Lincoln, Nebraska
Lorne Park Secondary School, Mississauga, Ontario, Canada
Marian Catholic High School, Chicago Heights, Illinois
Marist Catholic High School, Eugene, Oregon
Mayo High School, Rochester, Minnesota
McFarland High School, McFarland, Wisconsin
Miami Country Day School, Miami, Florida
Miami Southridge High School, Miami, Florida
Milne Valley Middle School, Toronto, Ontario
Montour High School, Robinson Township, Pennsylvania
Mountain Brook High School, Birmingham, Alabama
Mountain View High School, Mountain View, California
Mount Tabor High School, Winston-Salem, North Carolina
Murray High School (Utah), Murray, Utah
North Springs Charter High School, Sandy Springs, Georgia
North Surrey Secondary School, Surrey, British Columbia, Canada
Oak Lawn Community High School, Oak Lawn, Illinois 
Ocean Township High School, Ocean Township, Monmouth County, New Jersey
Ohio School for the Deaf, Columbus, Ohio
Orcutt Academy High School, Orcutt, California
Oshkosh North High School, Oshkosh, Wisconsin
Pinole Valley High School, Pinole, California
Pleasant Valley High School, Bettendorf, Iowa
Queensbury High School, Queensbury, New York
Quigley Preparatory Seminary South, Chicago, Illinois
Richmond Heights High School, Richmond Heights, Ohio
Richfield High School, Richfield, Minnesota
Ridgemont High School, Ottawa, Ontario
Riverdale High School (Pierrefonds, Quebec), Pierrefonds, Quebec
Roger Bacon High School, Cincinnati, Ohio
Romeoville High School, Chicago, Illinois
Salem High School, Salem, Virginia
Salmen High School, Slidell, Louisiana
Sanford High School, Sanford, Maine
Sanderson High School, Raleigh, North Carolina
Schurr High School, Montebello, California
Sentinel High School, Missoula, Montana
Sentinel Secondary School, West Vancouver, British Columbia, Canada
Seven Lakes High School, Fort Bend County, Texas
Sheridan High School, Sheridan, Oregon
Sisler High School, Winnipeg, Manitoba
Skyline High School, Sammamish, Washington
Smithfield-Selma High School, Smithfield, North Carolina
Solon High School, Solon, Iowa
South Caldwell High School, Hudson, North Carolina
South Knox High School, Vincennes, Indiana
South Warren High School, Bowling Green, Kentucky
Southern School of Energy and Sustainability, Durham, North Carolina
Southwestern High School, Shelbyville, Indiana
Souris Regional High School, Souris, Prince Edward Island, Canada
Spalding Catholic High School, Granville, Iowa
Sparta High School, Sparta Township, Michigan
Sparta High School, Sparta Township, New Jersey
Sparta High School, Sparta, Wisconsin
Springport High School, Springport, Michigan
Start High School, Toledo, Ohio
Stoneham High School, Stoneham, Massachusetts
St. Johns Country Day School, Orange Park, Florida
St. Mary's High School, Lynn, Massachusetts
Sun Valley High School, Monroe, North Carolina
Sylmar High School, Sylmar, California
Villa Park High School, Villa Park, California
Waynesville High School, Waynesville, Ohio
Webb School of Knoxville, Knoxville, Tennessee
West Springfield High School, Springfield, Virginia
Westlane Secondary School, Niagara Falls, Ontario, Canada
White Station High School, Memphis, Tennessee
Williamsville North High School, Williamsville, New York
Winthrop College Prep Academy, Riverview, Florida
W. W. Samuell High School, Dallas, Texas
Wyoming Valley West Senior High School, Plymouth, Pennsylvania

See also
List of ethnic sports team and mascot names
List of sports team names and symbols derived from Greek and Roman antiquity

References

Aurora university Spartans
Aurora Illinois

Lists of sports teams
Nicknames in sports
Sports culture
Athletic culture based on Greek antiquity